Shonan Institute of Technology High School is a high school in Kanagawa, Japan. It was founded in 1961 as high school attached to Shonan Institute of Technology

History
1961 - It was founded as Sagami Institute of Technology High School

Transportation and Location
The nearest train station is Tsujidō Station, which is about 1h away from Tokyo station by JR Tokaido-Main-Line. Most of the students take by bus or on foot from station to school as about 1 km away.

Famous Alumni and Alumnae
Makoto Akaho - a former basketball player
Yasuhiko Okudera - a former Japanese footballer who played for Sportverein Werder Bremen, 1. FC Köln, Hertha BSC Berlin, and the Japan national football team
Masahiro Fukuda - a former Japanese footballer who played for Urawa Red Diamonds (as called Mr. Urawa Reds) and the Japan national football team
Takeshi Hotta- a basketball coach
Makoto Okita - a former Japanese basketballer
Makoto Minamiyama - a former Japanese basketballer
Ai Sugiyama - a former Japanese Pro tennis player
Kenichiro Kogure - Japan national futsal teamplayer、
Reiko Nakamura - a Japanese Olympic and Asian record-holding swimmer. | bronze medalist at 2004 Athens Summer Olympics and 2008 Summer Olympics Beijing
Yukinori Suzuki - a basketball coach

Model School of Manga
Slam Dunk

External links
Shonan Institute of Technology High School official web site

Schools in Kanagawa Prefecture
Educational institutions established in 1961
Buildings and structures in Fujisawa, Kanagawa
High schools in Kanagawa Prefecture
1961 establishments in Japan